György Sándor (21 September 1912 – 9 December 2005) was a Hungarian pianist and writer.

Early years 
Sándor was born in Budapest. He studied at the Liszt Academy in Budapest under Béla Bartók and Zoltán Kodály, and debuted as a performer in 1930. He toured as a concert pianist through the 1930s, making his Carnegie Hall debut in 1939. He became an American citizen and served in the Army Signal Corps and the Intelligence and Special Services from 1942 to 1944.

Friends with Bartók 
Sándor remained friends with Bartók throughout his life, and was one of only ten people who attended Bartók's funeral in 1945. Sándor played the premiere of Bartók's Piano Concerto No. 3 on 8 February 1946 with the Philadelphia Orchestra conducted by Eugene Ormandy in Philadelphia, Pennsylvania. The performance was repeated on 26 February 1946 by the same ensemble in Carnegie Hall, New York, and recorded for Columbia Masterworks in April 1946.

Concert artist 
Following World War II, he returned to the concert stage. His technique was described as "Lisztian" and his repertoire universal, although later in his career his playing of Bartók was much in demand. Initially he recorded numerous piano works by Bach, Beethoven, Brahms, Chopin, Liszt, Rachmaninov, Schumann and others for Columbia Masterworks. Then with Vox, he recorded the complete works for solo piano of Zoltán Kodály and of Sergei Prokofiev; and the complete piano works of Béla Bartók; for the latter he won the Grand Prix du Disque of the Charles Cros Academy in 1965.

Family 
In 1950 he married Christa, née Satzger de Bálványos, the divorced wife of Archduke Karl Pius of Austria. They had one son, Michael, and were divorced.

Teaching 
Sándor taught at the Southern Methodist University, then at the University of Michigan from 1961 to 1981, and from 1982, at the Juilliard School. He continued to teach and perform into his nineties. His pupils included Hélène Grimaud, Deniz Arman Gelenbe, György Sebők, Aleksandra Romanić, Christina Kiss, Barbara Nissman, Ian Pace, Ljuba Moiz, Jungwon Jin, Derek Wieland, Charis Dimaras, fortepiano performer Malcolm Bilson, renowned teacher, Dr. J.D. Kelly, and composers Ezequiel Viñao, and Donald Bohlen.

Honorary degree 
In 1996 New York University awarded Sándor an honorary doctorate.

Manuscripts and published works 
He wrote a book "On Piano Playing: Motion, Sound, Expression", published by Schirmer Books, which is one of the most rational and clear accounts of piano technique. "Today more than ever, audiences mistake the excessively tense muscular activities of the performer for an intense musical experience, and all too often we see the public impressed and awed by convulsive distortions and spastic gyrations." Writing in The Guardian newspaper, Leo Black commented "musical performance desperately needs the sense of rightness, completeness and economy that pervaded his playing and thinking".

"On Piano Playing" details approaches to many problems that pianists face.  Sándor emphasized the use of gravity, an endless source of energy, during playing.  Ideas on memorizing are also addressed.  Importantly, "On Piano Playing" corrects these common misconceptions:  pianists only play with their fingers and only a few have the physical ability to play the piano.

A manuscript of a book on his mentor Béla Bartók and his music remains unpublished.

He produced several piano transcriptions, including a fantastically difficult arrangement of The Sorcerer's Apprentice by Dukas (pub. 1950), and the first two movements (Tempo di Ciaccona and Fuga) of Bartók's Sonata for Solo Violin (first perf. New York 1975; pub. 1977).

He also edited and published Bartók's own unpublished piano arrangement (made in January 1944) of the Concerto for Orchestra, at the request of the composer's son in 1985.  It was published in 2001, and has been recorded by Sándor.  Sándor wrote in his introduction to the edition: "It was agreed that the primary goal would not be to make the piano score easier to play, but to make it playable at all.  Furthermore, since Bartók's piano score contains only the first ending of the last movement, my role was to provide a reading for the second (alternative) ending.  Bartók wrote the second ending to avoid the rather abrupt conclusion of this grandiose work, and this is now accepted as the standard version of the last movement." He also edited the works for solo piano of Sergei Prokofiev.

Death 
He died in New York City of heart failure at age 93.

Media
 György Sándor plays Béla Bartók: Concerto for Orchestra, transcription for piano
 György Sándor plays Bach-Liszt Fantasy & Fugue in G minor

References

Sándor, György.  (1995).  "On Piano Playing:  Motion, Sound and Expression".  Boston, MA:  Schirmer.

External links
Interview with György Sándor by Bruce Duffie, February, 1990
, WNCN-FM, 10 August 1982
, WNCN-FM, 24 June 1983
 http://pastdaily.com/2015/06/10/gyorgy-sandor-piano-recital-at-wncn-1983-past-daily-mid-week-concert/

1912 births
2005 deaths
Hungarian classical pianists
Male classical pianists
Hungarian emigrants to the United States
Juilliard School faculty
Franz Liszt Academy of Music alumni
Pupils of Béla Bartók
Pupils of Zoltán Kodály
20th-century classical pianists
Musicians from Budapest
University of Michigan faculty
20th-century Hungarian male musicians